Carlo Cossio (1 January 1907 –  10 August 1964) was an Italian comic artist and animator.

Life and career
Born in Udine, Cossio started his career in 1928 as animator, realizing several short films in collaboration with his brother Vittorio.

In the following years Cossio created and illustrated several series including Furio Almirante, Buffalo Bill, Kansas Kid, Tanks pugno d'acciaio, X-1, La Freccia D'Argento. In 1955 he decided to retire, making only an occasional return to comics shortly before his death for the  comic book series Kolosso. He died of cancer in Milan on 10 August 1964, aged 57 years old.

References

External links
 Carlo Cossio at Treccani

1907 births
1964 deaths
People from Udine
Italian animators
Italian comics artists
Deaths from cancer in Lombardy
Italian stamp designers